James Case may refer to:
 James Herbert Case Jr. (1906–1965), American educator
 Jimmy Case (James Robert Case, born 1954), retired English football player
 Jim Case (James W. Case, 1927–2012), American television and film director and producer